Silver Hills, or Vellimadukunnu is a residential area in the city of Kozhikode (Calicut), in India.

See also
 Government Law College, Kozhikode
 Kovoor Town
 Kuttikkattoor
 Chevayur
 Pavangad, Kozhikode
 Chelpram
 Parambil Bazaar

Location

References

External links
view vellimadukunnu in map

Suburbs of Kozhikode